Popham Beach State Park is a public recreation area covering  on the Atlantic Ocean in the town of Phippsburg, Sagadahoc County, Maine. It is the state's highest volume day use State Park.  The state park occupies a dynamic shoreline landscape that has created a peninsula between the mouth of the Morse River and the Atkins Bay portion of the Kennebec River. The park is managed by the Maine Department of Agriculture, Conservation and Forestry.

Geology
The area is subject to significant changes in the landscape including dune destruction and rebuilding, loss of forest lands, and tombolo breaching. Efforts made to stop the erosion have included placing large boulders designed to hold off the surf.

Activities and amenities
The park is used for swimming, kayaking, fishing, picnicking, and hiking. The peninsula also is the site of historic Fort Popham, historic Fort Baldwin, and the remnants of the Popham Colony.

References

External links
Popham Beach State Park Department of Agriculture, Conservation and Forestry
Beach Scraping at Popham Beach State Park Maine Geological Survey
Migration of the Morse River into Back Dunes at Popham Beach State Park Maine Geological Survey
Seawall and Popham Beach Dynamics Maine Geological Survey
Setting the Stage for a Course Change at Popham Beach Maine Geological Survey
Storm and Channel Dynamics at Popham Beach State Park Maine Geological Survey
Tombolo Breach at Popham Beach State Park Maine Geological Survey

Beaches of Maine
State parks of Maine
Protected areas of Sagadahoc County, Maine
Landforms of Sagadahoc County, Maine
Popham Colony